Mweelrea at , is the 26th-highest peak in Ireland on the Arderin scale, and the 34th-highest peak on the Vandeleur-Lynam scale. Mweelrea is situated near the apex of a "horseshoe-shaped" massif that includes the peaks of Ben Lugmore and Ben Bury, and which is located between Killary Harbour and Doo Lough, in Mayo, Ireland.  Mweelrea is the provincial top for Connacht, and is noted for its southeastern cliff lined corries, and its views.  The massif is called the Mweelrea Mountains or the Mweelrea Range.

Naming

Geology
The geology of what is known as the Mweelrea Formation is very different from that of the Twelve Bens, on the other side of Killary Harbour.  At a summary level, the Mweelrea Formation consists of Ordovician period sandstones originally deposited on large alluvial fans, and distally‐equivalent alluvial plains and delta fans.  Interbedded with these sandstones are tufts, being ash deposits from Ordovician period volcanos.

Geography
Mweelrea, and its subsidiary peaks, form the southern half of the "horseshoe-shaped" massif of the Mweelrea Mountains, which are bounded by Killary Harbour, Ireland's deepest fjord, to the south, and Doo Lough to the north.

The valley in the centre of this "horseshoe" is the townsland of Glenconnelly. Two deep corries lie at the head of the Glenconnelly valley, below Mweelrea's southeast face; the southerly corrie contains Lough Lugaloughan, while the northerly corrie contains Lough Bellawaum; both are drained by the Sruhaunbunatrench River, which empties into the Bundorragha River, which itself flows into Killary Harbour.

Mweelrea's prominence of  qualifies it as a Marilyn, and it also ranks it as the 16th-highest mountain in Ireland on the MountainViews Online Database, 100 Highest Irish Mountains, where the minimum prominence threshold is 100 metres.

Southwest of Mweelrea is the southern arm of the "horseshoe", which is both lower and less sustained than the northern side. West of Mweelrea lie the County Mayo beaches of Uggool Beach and Silver Strand.

Recreation

Hill walking
As the highest mountain in Connacht, Mweelrea is climbed in "Four Peaks Challenge" formats, being the highest mountains in the four provinces of Ireland.

The fastest and most straightforward way to summit Mweelrea is via the 8–kilometre 3-hour Silver Strand Route.

A longer route is the 13-kilometre 6-hour round trip via the Lug More (or ) corrie and the valley of Glen Glencullin that take in the summits of Ben Bury and Ben Lugmore.  A notable feature known as The Ramp is used, which crosses the headwall of this corrie at mid-way, from east to west in an upward slope; reaching the ridge of Ben Lugmore at a col with Ben Bury. While this route is direct, caution is advised in properly finding The Ramp, as the corrie has extensive cliffs.

Mweelrea is also climbed as part of the 15-kilometre 6-7 hour Mweelrea Horseshoe, which is described by a notable Irish guidebook as one of "the top three" in Ireland.  The circuit starts and ends at the Delphi Mountain Resort, and takes in all the peaks of the massif of Mweelrea, including Ben Lugmore (and its subsidiary peaks), Ben Bury, Mweelrea and the Mweelrea SE Spur (or point 495-metres).

Rock climbing
While the main rock-climbing on the Mweelrea massif is on the northeastern slopes of Ben Lugmore (see here), there are long Grade 1 and 2 scrambles on the northeastern slopes of Mweelrea/Ben Bury.

Winter climbing
The Lough Bellawaum corrie, Mweelrea's northeastern corrie, also has a number of winter-climbs, the most notable of which are Blue Route (Grade II/III, 270 m), and Red Route (Grade III, 305 m).

Gallery

Bibliography

</ref>

See also

Maumturks, major range in Connemara
Twelve Bens, major range in Connemara
List of Irish counties by highest point
Lists of mountains in Ireland
Lists of mountains and hills in the British Isles 
List of P600 mountains in the British Isles
List of Marilyns in the British Isles
List of Hewitt mountains in England, Wales and Ireland

References

External links
MountainViews: The Irish Mountain Website, Mweelrea
MountainViews: Irish Online Mountain Database
The Database of British and Irish Hills , the largest database of British Isles mountains ("DoBIH")
Hill Bagging UK & Ireland, the searchable interface for the DoBIH

Marilyns of Ireland
Hewitts of Ireland
Mountains and hills of County Galway
Geography of County Galway
Mountains under 1000 metres